The 2018–19 season was the third in League One, the third tier of the English football league system, for AFC Wimbledon since their promotion in 2016 from League Two. Along with competing in League One, the Kingston upon Thames-based club participated in three cup competitions, the FA Cup, EFL Cup and EFL Trophy.

Matches

Pre-season friendlies
The Dons revealed they will play Reading, Woking, Queens Park Rangers, Brighton & Hove Albion, Havant & Waterlooville and Boreham Wood.

League One

League table

Results summary

Results by matchday

Matches
On 21 June 2018, the League One fixtures for the forthcoming season were announced.

August

September

October

November

December

January

February

March

April

May

FA Cup

The first round draw was made live on BBC by Dennis Wise and Dion Dublin on 22 October. The draw for the second round was made live on BBC and BT by Mark Schwarzer and Glenn Murray on 12 November. The third round draw was made live on BBC by Ruud Gullit and Paul Ince from Stamford Bridge on 3 December 2018. The fourth round draw was made live on BBC by Robbie Keane and Carl Ikeme from Wolverhampton on 7 January 2019. The fifth round draw was broadcast on 28 January 2019 live on BBC, Alex Scott and Ian Wright conducted the draw.

EFL Cup

On 15 June 2018, the draw for the first round was made in Vietnam. The second round draw was made from the Stadium of Light on 16 August.

EFL Trophy

On 13 July 2018, the initial group stage draw bar the U21 invited clubs was announced. The draw for the second round was made live on Talksport by Leon Britton and Steve Claridge on 16 November.

Squad

Transfers

Transfers in

Transfers out

Loans in

Loans out

References

AFC Wimbledon seasons
AFC Wimbledon